Lynette Hemmant was born in London, grew up in South Wales, Australia and the Home Counties.  She went to St Martin’s School of Art before her sixteenth birthday, graduated in 1958 and started working as an illustrator of children’s books for Hamish Hamilton, later OUP and other publishers.  She illustrated several classics: Dickens’s “Christmas Carol”, Jane Austen’s “Pride and Prejudice” and “The Rubaiyat of Omar Khayyam”, as well as more modern children’s authors.

She was commissioned to design a set of Christmas stamps for the Island of Guernsey and a cover for Reader’s Digest magazine.  She was listed in Best Children’s Books of the Year and her work was used for tv storytelling in the UK.  For many years she was a contributor to the magazine “Cricket” and its sister magazines in the USA and created several of their covers.  Also in the USA, she was commissioned by the Unicover Corporation of Wyoming to paint the twelve months of the year in the English countryside for a set of collectors plates.

Her first solo painting show was in Italy (Bellagio, on Lake Como), after which she restricted illustration to work outside the book market.  Larger works commissioned included two overmantel paintings for an eighteenth century house in London and drawings, subsequently engraved on glass, for a 10ft x 6ft model theatre for an exhibition at the Queen’s House in Greenwich, London.  Her work has been shown in solo and shared exhibitions in the UK, Italy, Australia and the USA and is in private collections all over the world.

She has been interviewed and work reproduced in magazines in the UK, USA and Japan.  She has been a demonstration artist for partworks, “The Art of Drawing and Painting” (Eagle Moss) and a feature artist in a book on landscape painting (Windsor & Newton/Rotovision).  Her garden has been a constant source of images, as was the time she spent in Venice.  In the winter she works on still life and hoping to improve summer work in the studio.

In the spring of 2013 she was asked to address students at the Birmingham School of Art and was created an International Research Fellow of the Centre for Fine Art Research of Birmingham University.

She welcomes visits to her studio in Camberwell, south-east London.

Notes

External links
 Lynette Hemmant

English illustrators
Alumni of Saint Martin's School of Art
Living people
1938 births